This is a list showing the most populous cities in the province of Balochistan, Pakistan as of the 2017 Census of Pakistan. In the following table, you can find each of the 54 cities and towns in the province with populations higher than 10,000 as of March 15, 2017. City populations found in this list only refer to populations found within the city's defined limits and any adjacent cantonments. The census totals below come from the Pakistan Bureau of Statistics.

List

Notes 

A.  This city did not exist as a municipality and was not classified as an urban area at the time of the 1998 Pakistan Census.

References

See also 

 List of cities in Pakistan by population
 List of cities in Azad Jammu & Kashmir by population
 List of cities in Gilgit-Baltistan by population
 List of cities in Khyber Pakhtunkhwa by population
 List of cities in Sindh by population
 List of cities in Punjab, Pakistan by population

Balochistan